Justine McCarthy is an Irish writer, broadcaster and a columwith The Irish Times. One of Ireland's most respected commentators on politics and culture, she is Adjunct Professor of Journalism at the University of Limerick. She often appeared on Tonight with Vincent Browne.

She is the author of Mary McAleese: The Outsider, about the eighth President of Ireland, and Deep Deception: Ireland's Swimming Scandals, praised by Pat Kenny and Joe Duffy and described by Fintan O'Toole as "the best of the large crop of books by Irish journalists this year, it grows beyond its immediate subject to become a terrifying anatomy of the capacity for denial and vilification within any enclosed world".

In October 2010, Kevin Myers criticised McCarthy for an article she wrote concerning John Waters, describing it as "the very quintessence of the feminist narrative". In August 2011, David Quinn, founder of the Catholic think tank Iona Institute, objected to McCarthy's Sunday Time''s column critiquing his conservative agenda.

McCarthyhas won more than a dozen national Journalism Awards, including the 2012 and 2022 NNI Journalism Awards honour in category Columnist of the Year.

References

Living people
Year of birth missing (living people)
Irish non-fiction writers
Irish women non-fiction writers
Irish political writers
Irish women journalists
20th-century Irish women writers
21st-century Irish women writers
Academics of the University of Limerick
People from County Cork